The Amazing Eternals is a cancelled team-based multiplayer online first-person shooter video game developed and published by Digital Extremes.

Background
Digital Extremes publicly announced and began the game's closed alpha on May 23, 2017, under the development codename "Keystone". Closed beta began on August 29, 2017. On October 26, 2017, development was "paused", according to a forum post by a staff member. The cancellation of the project and Digital Extremes' decision to refocus on its more successful title Warframe was later attributed in part the commercial failure of LawBreakers and the lack of interest in The Amazing Eternals closed beta.

References

External links
 

Cancelled Windows games
Hero shooters
Video games developed in Canada